Dean Anthony Fagan (born 1988) is a British actor. He is best known for portraying mechanic Luke Britton in the ITV soap opera Coronation Street from 2014 to 2018.

Early life
Fagan graduated from the University of Salford in 2010.

Career
Fagan started his career in the British adventure film Treasure of Albion in 2006. Later in 2010, he starred as Mikey Craig in the biographical drama television film, Worried About the Boy, directed by Julian Jarrold and written by Tony Basgallop, which is based on the life of English singer Boy George.

In 2014, Fagan starred as Luke Britton in the ITV soap opera Coronation Street. Fagan described his character, Luke "is an ambitious cheeky chappy who's a dreamer as well. He dreams about his future aspirations, and he dreams about women too! He tries his best to attain his goals and improve himself, but whether he keeps his focus is another matter, because he's easily distracted! He's a nice guy but he has a past." Fagan left the cast in 2018, with Britton's final scenes airing on 5 January 2018. On leaving Coronation Street, Fagan shared that Britton was "going to be a pivotal part of the start of [Phelan]’s demise, the start of the unravelling, that someone else has found out the truth and he has now killed again which is a desperate act and one that is going to eventually start more questions being asked."

In 2021, Fagan starred as Stevie in the three-part BBC One television drama Time about a visceral, emotional and high-stakes portrayal of life in a British prison.

In January 2022, Fagan starred in the second series of the in the RTÉ One thriller drama series Smother, in which he portrayed Denis Ahern's estranged son, Finn. In regards of his casting in the series, Fagan stated that it was a new challenge starring alongside Dervla Kirwan. He also recalled his experience working on set in Coronation Street with Smother:

Filmography

Television

Film

Video Games

References

External links 

1988 births
Living people
20th-century English male actors
21st-century English male actors
Black British male actors
English male television actors
Alumni of the University of Salford